Javad Davari (born April 25, 1983) is president of Islamic Republic of Iran Basketball Federation from February 2022. He was former Iranian professional basketball player, played as a point guard for Foolad Mahan in the Iranian Basketball Super League. He is also a member of the Iranian national basketball team and competed at the 2008 Olympic Basketball Tournament. Davari previously played for Zob Ahan before joining Petrochimi.

Honours

National team
Asian Championship
Gold medal: 2007, 2009, 2013
Asian Games
Bronze medal: 2010

References

External links
 RealGM profile

Living people
1983 births
Asian Games bronze medalists for Iran
Asian Games medalists in basketball
Basketball players at the 2008 Summer Olympics
Basketball players at the 2010 Asian Games
Foolad Mahan Isfahan BC players
Iranian men's basketball players
Mahram Tehran BC players
Medalists at the 2010 Asian Games
Olympic basketball players of Iran
Point guards
Sportspeople from Isfahan
Zob Ahan Isfahan BC players
2010 FIBA World Championship players